Teel's Marsh is a playa in Nevada, United States.  It was the site of "Borax" Smith's first borax works at Marietta, Nevada in 1872, and became the start of his operations that soon became the largest borax operation in the world.

References 

Landforms of Mineral County, Nevada